"Tain't What You Do (It's the Way That You Do It)" is a song written by jazz musicians Melvin "Sy" Oliver and James "Trummy" Young. It was first recorded in 1939 by Jimmie Lunceford, Harry James, and Ella Fitzgerald, and again the same year by Nat Gonella and His Georgians. The "shim sham" is often danced to the Lunceford recording of this song.

Fun Boy Three with Bananarama version

The jazz tune was transformed into a pop/new wave song with ska elements in 1982. With the title slightly altered to "It Ain't What You Do....", it was recorded by Fun Boy Three and Bananarama, and was included on the former's self-titled debut album, but it was not available on a Bananarama album until 1988's Greatest Hits Collection.

Terry Hall of Fun Boy Three owned a copy of Bananarama's previous single "Aie a Mwana", and after seeing an article about the trio in The Face, he decided he wanted them to sing background vocals on the song, solely based on the fact that he liked their look. "It Ain't What You Do...." became a big hit in the UK, climbing to number four in the UK Singles Chart, and achieving a Silver certification from the British Phonographic Industry. The success of the single also prompted Bananarama to return the favour and have Fun Boy Three sing on their next single, "Really Saying Something".

Media appearances
 In 2012, the cover version was used in a commercial for Hewlett-Packard's color printers, which aired in the United States.
 Throughout the early-mid 2010s, English DIY retailer B&Q used Fun Boy Three's version of the song.
 Fun Boy Three's version of the song was also used in another television advertisement for the Chrysler PT Cruiser in the United Kingdom in the early 2000s.
 The Lunceford version of the song appeared in the final episode of the third season of The Marvelous Mrs. Maisel.

Track listings
 7" single
"It Ain't What You Do (It's The Way That You Do It)"  2:54
"The Funrama Theme"  2:56 +

 12" single
"It Ain't What You Do..." / "Just Do It" (Extended Version)  5:55 ++
"The Funrama Theme" (Extended Version)  5:55 +

+ A remix of "The Funrama Theme" with overdubbed brass, titled "Funrama 2", appears on The Fun Boy Three's album The Fun Boy Three.

++ The first 2:52 of the 12" version is the standard album version of the song, which is different from the 7". Some reissues of the album also include the "Just Do It" section as a separate track.

Charts

References

1939 songs
1982 singles
Bananarama songs
Fun Boy Three songs
Mildred Bailey songs
Songs with music by Trummy Young
Music videos directed by Steve Barron
Songs with music by Sy Oliver